Tombi is a Meitei ethnic given name, meaning little, small, tiny, young. This name is common to both genders. 
Notable people with this given name are:
 N. Tombi Singh, Indian politician
 Khumujam Tombi Devi, Indian judoka

See also 
 Tomba (Meitei name)